The Gulf War Did Not Take Place is a collection of three short essays by Jean Baudrillard published in the French newspaper Libération and British paper The Guardian between January and March 1991.
 Part 1, "The Gulf War will not take place" (La guerre du Golfe n'aura pas lieu) was published in Libération on January 4, 1991.
 Part 2, "The Gulf War is not really taking place" (La guerre du Golfe a-t-elle vraiment lieu?) was published in Libération on February 6, 1991, and
 Part 3, "The Gulf War did not take place" (La Guerre du Golfe n'a pas eu lieu) was published in Libération on March 29, 1991.

Contrary to the title, the author believes that the events and violence of the Gulf War actually took place, whereas the issue is one of interpretation: were the events that took place comparable to how they were presented, and could these events be called a war? The title is a reference to the play The Trojan War Will Not Take Place by Jean Giraudoux (in which characters attempt to prevent what the audience knows is inevitable).

The essays in Libération and The Guardian were published before, during and after the Gulf War and they were titled accordingly: during the American military and rhetorical buildup as "The Gulf War Will Not Take Place"; during military action as "The Gulf War Is Not Taking Place", and after action was over, "The Gulf War Did Not Take Place". A book of elongated versions of the truncated original articles in French was published in May 1991. The English translation was published in early 1995 translated by Paul Patton.

Summary 
Baudrillard argued the Gulf War was not really a war, but rather an atrocity which masqueraded as a war. Using overwhelming airpower, the American military for the most part did not directly engage in combat with the Iraqi army, and suffered few casualties. Almost nothing was made known about Iraqi deaths. Thus, the fighting "did not really take place" from the point of view of the West. Moreover, all that spectators got to know about the war was in the form of propaganda imagery. The closely watched media presentations made it impossible to distinguish between the experience of what truly happened in the conflict, and its stylized, selective misrepresentation through simulacra.

References

Further reading
 Baudrillard, Jean (1991) La Guerre du Golfe n'a pas eu lieu, Paris: Galilée.
 Baudrillard, Jean (1995) The Gulf War Did Not Take Place, Bloomington: Indiana University Press

1995 non-fiction books
Books by Jean Baudrillard
Books in philosophy of technology
Essays about hyperreality
French non-fiction books
Gulf War books